, or Mount Kaimon, is an undissected volcano – consisting of a basal stratovolcano and a small complex central lava dome – which rises to a height of 924 metres above sea level near the city of Ibusuki in southern Kyūshū, Japan. The last eruption occurred in the year 885 CE. Because of its conic shape, Mt. Kaimon is sometimes referred to as "the Fuji of Satsuma".

Geography 
Mt. Kaimon is located in the south of Kagoshima prefecture, Kyushu and is an important reference point for marine traffic because it is the southernmost prominence of the Satsuma Peninsula. This is one entrance  marker to Kinko Bay (Kagoshima Bay) complimentary to the Ōsumi Peninsula. Together with Mt. Noma and Mt. Kinpo, it is used by marine traffic.

Geology 
Part of the Ibusuki volcanic field, Mt. Kaimon defines the eastern margin of the old Ata Caldera.

There is a sea scarp which is 7.8km wide and 9.3km long, the shape is similar to a horseshoe in the seabed at the southern foot of the mountain. There is a lot of sediment at the foot of the mountain due to submarine landslides. It was found that there is a sea scarp underground on the south side of the mountain and it was caused by pressure from a submarine landslide before Mt. Kaimon was formed. 

The sedimentary layer of ejecta from the eruption at the end of the 7th century is called ao-kora (ao means blue and kora is soil consisting of volcanic ash found in the southern part of the Satsuma Peninsula). The sedimentary layer of ejecta by the eruption at the end of the 7th century is called murasaki-kora (Murasaki means purple). These layers are a clue to know the changes in life in this era. It has become clear that a village was isolated by a large eruption with change in life style in the latter part of the 9th century.

Eruptive History 

 
Mt. Kaimon began volcanic activity about 4000 years ago. From 3,000 years up to 885 years ago, large eruptions occurred 9 times and eruptions resulting in large amounts of lava occurred 10 times making twelve major eruptions to date.

The two large eruptions in the historic written record are in 874 CE (Jogan era) and 885 CE (Nin-na era)
The complex layered central dome consists of a scoria cone topped by lava flows and ultimately a lava dome which was penetrated by a plug. However the explosion crater at the top was last enlarged by the 885 CE eruption.

Transition of height 

Climbing
The spiral-shaped hiking trail climb of Mt. Kaimon takes about 3 hours. Mt. Kaimon is a single peak but with summit rocky outcrops that allow views on all sides, such as Lake Ikeda to the north and the Pacific Ocean to the south.

Tourism
 Kaimon Sanroku Nature Park - The Tokara horse, is breed at the base of the mountain. 

 Kaimon Sanroku Fureai Park - There are log houses as well as camp sites.  

 Hirasaki Shrine

 Lake Ikeda - It is said that a mystery creature “Issie” lives there. The Canola flowering in January is very attractive. 

 Bohi Park - Memorial to those killed in the Pacific War in Philippines.

See also
 List of volcanoes in Japan

References

External links 
 Kaimondake - Japan Meteorological Agency 
  - Japan Meteorological Agency

Ibusuki, Kagoshima
Mountains of Kagoshima Prefecture
Stratovolcanoes of Japan
Volcanoes of Kagoshima Prefecture
Volcanoes of Kyushu